The Roman Catholic Diocese of Georgetown (Latin: Dioecesis Georgiopolitana) (erected 12 April 1837, as the Vicariate Apostolic of British Guiana) is a suffragan of the Archdiocese of Port of Spain. It was elevated to the Diocese of Georgetown on 29 February 1956. The diocese's cathedral, the Cathedral of the Immaculate Conception, is located in Georgetown, Guyana.

Bishops

Ordinaries
William Clancy (1837 - 1843)
John Thomas Hynes, O.P. (1846 - 1858)
James Etheridge, S.J. (1858 - 1877)
Anthony Butler, S.J. (1878 - 1901)
Compton Theodore Galton, S.J. (1902 - 1931)
George Weld, S.J. (1932 - 1954)
Richard Lester Guilly, S.J. (1956 - 1972)
Benedict Ganesh Singh (1972 - 2003)
Francis Dean Alleyne, O.S.B. (2003 - )

Auxiliary bishop
Benedict Ganesh Singh (1971 - 1972), appointed Bishop here

Other priest of this diocese who became bishop
John Derek Persaud, appointed Bishop of Mandeville, Jamaica in 2020

References 

http://www.rcdiocesegy.org/site/ 

http://www.gcatholic.org/dioceses/country/GY.htm

http://www.catholic-hierarchy.org/diocese/dgeor.html

Georgetown
Georgetown
Georgetown
1837 establishments in British Guiana
Roman Catholic Ecclesiastical Province of Port of Spain